Johnny Maxey (born October 19, 1993) is an American football defensive end who is a free agent. He played college football at Mars Hill University and signed with the Pittsburgh Steelers as an undrafted free agent in 2016.

College career
Maxey played for the Mars Hill Lions, where he was a second-team South Atlantic Conference performer after getting 82 tackles and three sacks as a senior.

Professional career

Pittsburgh Steelers
Maxey was signed by the Steelers as an undrafted rookie free agent following the 2016 NFL Draft on May 1, 2016. He was released as part of final roster cuts and signed to the teams' practice squad on September 4, 2016.

After suffering several injuries along the defensive line, the Steelers promoted Maxey to the active roster on December 24, 2016. He made his debut the next day in a key victory against the Baltimore Ravens. On January 1, 2017, he made his first career tackle in a 27–24 overtime victory over the Cleveland Browns.

On September 2, 2017, Maxey was waived by the Steelers.

Tennessee Titans
On December 19, 2017, Maxey was signed to the Tennessee Titans' practice squad. He signed a reserve/future contract with the Titans on January 15, 2018. On April 30, 2018, Maxey was released. On July 31, 2018, he was re-signed by the Titans. He was waived/injured on August 10, 2018 and was placed on injured reserve. He was released on October 23, 2018.

Alliance of American Football
In 2019, Maxey signed with the Memphis Express of the Alliance of American Football, but did not make the final roster. Instead, he joined the Birmingham Iron. The league ceased operations in April 2019.

Houston Roughnecks
In October 2019, Maxey was picked by the Houston Roughnecks during the open phase of the 2020 XFL Draft. He had his contract terminated when the league suspended operations on April 10, 2020.

Tampa Bay Bandits
Maxey signed with the Tampa Bay Bandits of the USFL on April 1, 2022, but was released six days later.

References

External links
Mars Hill Lions bio
Pro-Football reference

1993 births
Living people
Players of American football from Columbia, South Carolina
American football defensive ends
Mars Hill Lions football players
Pittsburgh Steelers players
Tennessee Titans players
Memphis Express (American football) players
Birmingham Iron players
Houston Roughnecks players